Willard Sebastian Scissum (born October 28, 1962) is American football coach and former player.  Most recently he was an assistant coach at Savannah State University.  Scissum played college football at the University of Alabama and professionally in the National Football League (NFL) for the Washington Redskins.  He served as the head football coach at Morehouse College from 2002 to 2004.

Head coaching record

References

External links
 Alabama State profile

1962 births
Living people
American football offensive tackles
Alabama A&M Bulldogs football coaches
Alabama Crimson Tide football coaches
Alabama Crimson Tide football players
Alabama State Hornets football coaches
Alcorn State Braves football coaches
BC Lions players
Berlin Thunder coaches
Calgary Stampeders players
Clark Atlanta Panthers football coaches
Fort Valley State Wildcats football coaches
Morehouse Maroon Tigers football coaches
Morris Brown Wolverines football coaches
Savannah State Tigers football coaches
Washington Redskins players
People from Guntersville, Alabama
Sportspeople from Huntsville, Alabama
Players of American football from Alabama
African-American coaches of American football
African-American players of American football
African-American players of Canadian football
21st-century African-American people
20th-century African-American sportspeople